The Baldwin VO-660  was a diesel-electric locomotive switcher built by Baldwin Locomotive Works between April, 1939 and May, 1946. The 197,520–203,980 lb (89,600–92,500 kg) units were powered by a  six-cylinder diesel engine rated at 660 horsepower (492 kW), and rode on two-axle AAR Type-A switcher trucks in a B-B wheel arrangement. 142 examples of this model were built for American railroads, along with the United States Navy. Baldwin replaced the VO-660 with the model DS-4-4-660 in 1946.

In the early 1960s the Reading Company sent all 10 of their VO-660s to General Motors Electro-Motive Division to have them rebuilt to SW900 specifications.  These locomotives received new frames, cabs, and carbodies, and reused only the trucks and batteries from the VO-660's. Only four intact examples of the VO-660 are known to survive today. One was built as Baldwin 335, the first production VO-660. It was sold by the Altoona Railroaders Memorial Museum to SMS Lines to be repaired and put back into operation. SMS also owns the former Warner 11, which is being restored before being put into service. The others are Pickens Railway #2, built in 1946, and Wyandotte Terminal 103, at the Illinois Railway Museum. Those two are inoperable at the present time.

Units produced

References

External links 
 Baldwin VO-660 Roster
 BLW Demonstrators, Prototypes and Test Beds
  CKD Praha 6S310DR diesel engine, and the Baldwin VO and 600 series engines
 Existing Baldwin VO Model Units
 Preserved Baldwin and Lima Locomotives
 PRR Diesel Locomotive diagrams: Baldwin VO-660
 VO-660 — Original Owners
 Illinois Railway Museum roster page for Wyandotte Terminal 103

VO-0660
B-B locomotives
Diesel-electric locomotives of the United States
Railway locomotives introduced in 1939
Standard gauge locomotives of Cuba
Standard gauge locomotives of the United States
Diesel-electric locomotives of Cuba
Shunting locomotives